Cornhill (formerly also Cornhil) is a ward and street in the City of London, the historic nucleus and financial centre of modern London. The street runs between Bank Junction and Leadenhall Street.

The hill from which it takes its name is one of the three ancient hills of London; the others are Tower Hill, site of the Tower of London, and Ludgate Hill, crowned by St Paul's Cathedral.

History

Cornhill is one of the traditional divisions of the City. The street contains two of the City churches designed by Sir Christopher Wren: St. Michael, Cornhill, and St Peter upon Cornhill, reputed to occupy the oldest Christianised site in London. Both are on the site of the Roman forum of Londinium. At its other end it meets Threadneedle Street, Poultry, Lombard Street and others at Bank junction. Sir Thomas Gresham's original Royal Exchange fronted onto Cornhill, but its successor on the site, designed by William Tite, faces towards the Bank of England across the junction with Threadneedle Street.

The "Standard" near the junction of Cornhill and Leadenhall Street was the first mechanically pumped public water supply in London, constructed in 1582 on the site of earlier hand-pumped wells and gravity-fed conduits. The mechanism, a force pump driven by a water wheel under the northernmost arch of London Bridge, transferred water from the Thames through lead pipes to four outlets. The service was discontinued in 1603. This became the mark from which many distances to and from London were measured and the name still appears on older mileposts (but see also the nearby London Stone and St. Mary-le-Bow church).

In 1652, Pasqua Rosée, possibly a native of Ragusa, Italy, opened London's first coffeehouse, in St. Michael's Alley off Cornhill.

The publishers Smith, Elder and Co, based at No. 65, published the popular literary journal Cornhill Magazine from 1860 to 1975, as well as the Dictionary of National Biography. The magazine was first edited by William Makepeace Thackeray.

Cornhill Street is the address of the "Scrooge and Marley" counting house, as well as the employer of Bob Cratchit, in Charles Dicken's 1843 novella, "A Christmas Carol".

Contemporary Cornhill
Today, the street is commonly associated with opticians and makers of optical apparatus such as microscopes and telescopes.  A statue of the engineer James Henry Greathead was erected in 1994 in the road beside the Royal Exchange, which lies within the ward. Underneath the modern pavement is the world's first underground public toilet, which opened in 1855. Users were charged a standard fee of 1d, reputedly giving rise to the saying to "spend a penny".

Cornhill formed part of the marathon course of the 2012 Olympic and Paralympic Games. The women's Olympic marathon took place on 5 August and the men's Olympic marathon on 12 August. The four Paralympic marathons were held on 9 September.

The postcode for the street is EC3V.

Role in City elections
Cornhill is one of 25 wards in the City of London, and each elects an Alderman to the Court of Aldermen, and Commoners (the City equivalent of a councillor) to the Court of Common Council of the City of London Corporation. Only electors who are Freemen of the City of London are eligible to stand.

The current alderman is Robert Howard and the current members of Common Council are Peter Dunphy (Deputy), Reverend Stephen Haines and Ian Seaton.

The most recent Common Council election results, from 23 March 2017, are below:

References

External links
 The Official Cornhill Ward Website
 City of London Corporation Map of Cornhill Ward (2011)
 "The English coffee houses"
 Cornhill, after a London map of 1750

Geography of the City of London
Hills of London
Streets in the City of London
Wards of the City of London